The Ganges Basin is a part of the  Ganges-Brahmaputra-Meghna (GBM) basin draining 1,999,000 square kilometres in Tibet, Nepal, India and Bangladesh. To the north, the Himalaya or lower parallel ranges beyond form the Ganges-Brahmaputra divide.   On the west the Ganges Basin borders the Indus basin and then the Aravalli ridge.  Southern limits are the Vindhyas and Chota Nagpur Plateau.  On the east the Ganges merges with the Brahmaputra through a complex system of common distributaries into the Bay of Bengal.  Its catchment lies in the states of Uttar Pradesh (294,364 km2), Madhya Pradesh (198,962 km2), Bihar (143,961 km2), Rajasthan (112,490 km2), West Bengal (71,485 km2), Haryana (34,341 km2), Himachal Pradesh (4,317 km2), Delhi, Arunachal Pradesh (1,484 km2), the whole of Bangladesh, Nepal and Bhutan.  Several tributaries rise inside Tibet before flowing south through Nepal. The basin has a population of more than 500 million, making it the most populated river basin in the world.

Description

The basin comprises semi-arid valleys in the rain shadow north of the Himalaya, densely forested mountains south of the highest ranges, the scrubby Shiwalik foothills and the fertile Gangetic Plains. Central highlands south of the Gangetic Plain have plateaus, hills and mountains intersected by valleys and river plains. The important soil types found in the basin are sand, loam, clay and their combinations such as sandy loam, silty clay etc.

The annual surface water potential of the basin has been assessed as 525 km³ in India, out of which 250 km³ is utilisable water. There is about 580,000 km2 of arable land; 29.5% of the cultivable area of India.

Water-related issues of the basin are due to both high and low flows. In India, the states of Uttrakhand, Uttar Pradesh, Bihar and West Bengal are affected by floods. Bangladesh – at the confluence of Brahmaputra River and Ganges River – suffers from severe floods almost every year. Northern Ganges tributaries such as Kosi, Gandak and Mahananda are the most flood-prone, but southern tributaries also contribute.  Low flows are caused by scarcity of rainfall outside the summer Monsoon, and sometimes by failure of this monsoon to develop to its normal extent.
The Ganges is joined by Kosi, Ghaghra, Gandak from the Himalayas and by Chambal, Betwa, Son from the peninsular region.

See also 

 Foreland basin
 Forebulge

References
https://www.tandfonline.com/doi/abs/10.1080/14634988.2017.1304129

External links

 Bibliography on Water Resources and International Law. Peace Palace Library
  S Asia's deadly Himalayan fault
 http://cpwfbfp.pbwiki.com

 
.
Drainage basins of India
Landforms of Bangladesh
Northeast India
Freshwater ecoregions